CD5 or CD-5 may be:

 CD5 (protein), cluster of differentiation 5 molecule, type I transmembrane protein
 Compact disc, 5-inch CD, usually music CD
 CD single, a music single on a 5-inch CD
CD-5 drill site at Alpine, Alaska oil field

Clusters of differentiation